Lemonia taraxaci, the autumn silkworm moth, is a species of moth of the family Brahmaeidae (older classifications placed it in Lemoniidae). It was first described by Michael Denis and Ignaz Schiffermüller in 1775 and it is found in south-eastern Europe.

The wingspan is 45–65 mm. The moth flies from August to October depending on the location.

The larvae feed on Hieracium and Taraxacum species.

References

External links
"06806 Lemonia taraxaci ([Denis & Schiffermüller 	], 1775) - Löwenzahn-Wiesenspinner". Lepiforum e.V. Retrieved November 4, 2018.
Schmetterlinge-Deutschlands.de 

Brahmaeidae
Moths described in 1775
Moths of Europe
Taxa named by Michael Denis
Taxa named by Ignaz Schiffermüller